Tapasvi Mehta (born 17 January 1993) is an Indian actor, musician and cinematographer who made his debut in the Disney Channel India show, Ishaan.

Career

Mehta started his acting career at the age of 12 with an "Essel World" commercial. Later that year he did a mythological TV series for Zee TV called Raavan. He was seen in the Disney Channel India show, Ishaan. He played the role of main character, Ishaan. He was also nominated for the best actor award 4 times for it. His most recent role is as Rocky Singh Ahluwalia in the Sony TV drama, Parvarrish - Kuchh Khattee Kuchh Meethi. He is currently working on a short film called Bubblegum which also stars Rohan Shah and Kishan Savjani along with him. Till date, he has done about 15 TV shows including Mahima Shani Dev Ki, Tujko Hai Salaam Zindgi , Ek Safar Aisa Kabhi Socha Na Tha, Gumrah and many more. He was also recently seen in the Red Label Tea advertisement. Tapasvi is now waiting for his feature film to release in which he plays the younger version of the lead protagonist.

Filmography

References

External links
 

Living people
Indian male television actors
21st-century Indian male child actors
1993 births